Field of view can refer to:

 Angle of view, which also describes the field of view in photography and image processing
 Field of view, in general and biological contexts
 Field of view in video games
 The J-Pop band Field of View
 A music track from the video game Hyperdimension Neptunia Mk2